Gordo (Spanish and Portuguese for "fat") may refer to:

People
 Afonso II of Portugal (1185–1223), King of Portugal nicknamed "o Gordo ("the Fat")
 Gordon Cooper (1927–2004), one of the seven original American astronauts, nicknamed "Gordo"
 Kaio de Almeida (born 1984), Brazilian swimmer nicknamed "Gordo as a child
 Agustín Calleri (born 1976), Argentine retired tennis player nicknamed "Gordo"
 John Gordon (broadcaster) (born 1940), retired Major League Baseball radio broadcaster nicknamed "Gordo"
 Ricardo María Carles Gordó (1926–2013), Roman Catholic cardinal priest and Archbishop Emeritus of Barcelona
 Gordon Lish (born 1934), American writer and editor who used the pseudonym "Gordo Lockwood"

Places
 Gordo, Alabama, USA, a town
 Monte Gordo, Cape Verde, the highest point on the island of São Nicolau, Cape Verde
 Gordo, a hill or mountain in Añasco, Puerto Rico

In entertainment
 Gordo (comic strip), a comic strip (1941–1985) created by Gus Arriola
 Gordo, a spiked invincible enemy in the Kirby series of video games
 David "Gordo" Gordon, a character from the Disney sitcom Lizzie McGuire
 Eddy Gordo, a character from the Tekken series of fighting games
 Gordo, a gluttonous Black Pirate in the video game Skies of Arcadia
 Gordo, an undead abomination in the Warcraft Universe
 Gordo, a fictional character from the anime series Beyblade V-Force
 Mr. Gordo, the name of Buffy Summers' stuffed pig in Buffy the Vampire Slayer

Other uses
 Gordo High School, Gordo, Alabama
 Gordo (space monkey), the first monkey to travel beyond Earth's orbit
 Gordo (dinosaur), a dinosaur specimen of the genus Barosaurus
 Chipotle, also called gordo in Mexico
 Gordo, another name for the Muscat of Alexandria grape
 GORDO, an operating system circa 1969, used by the UCLA ARPANET host

See also
 
 
 El Gordo (disambiguation)

Lists of people by nickname